"Va Va Voom" is a song by Nicki Minaj.

Va Va Voom or va-va-voom may also refer to:
"Va Va Voom", 1986 song by Ray Davies 
Va Va Voom, the 1998 debut album of the British indie pop band Cinerama
A term used in Renault Clio commercials

Va Va Va Voom may also refer to:
"Va Va Va Voom", 1954 song by Art Carney 
"Va Va Va Voom", 1974 song by Brett Smiley

See also
Vavoom (disambiguation)